The 1990 Big East men's basketball tournament took place at Madison Square Garden in New York City, from March 8 to March 11, 1990. Its winner received the Big East Conference's automatic bid to the 1990 NCAA tournament. It is a single-elimination tournament with four rounds.  Syracuse and Connecticut tied for the best regular-season conference record.  Based on tie-breakers, Syracuse was awarded the #1 seed.

Connecticut defeated Syracuse in the championship game 78–75, to claim its first Big East tournament championship.

Bracket

Awards
Dave Gavitt Trophy (Most Valuable Player): Chris Smith, Connecticut

All-Tournament Team
 Derrick Coleman, Syracuse
 Tate George, Connecticut
 Tom Greis, Villanova
 John Gwynn, Connecticut
 Chris Smith, Connecticut
 Stephen Thompson, Syracuse

References

External links
 

Tournament
Big East men's basketball tournament
Basketball in New York City
College sports in New York City
Sports competitions in New York City
Sports in Manhattan
Big East men's basketball tournament
Big East men's basketball tournament
1990s in Manhattan
Madison Square Garden